Manuel Meana (21 October 1901 – 1 August 1985) was a Spanish footballer. He was capped for Spain 7 times and was part of Spain's squad for the football tournament at the 1924 Summer Olympics, but he did not play in any matches. Under the presidency of Santiago Bernabéu he was the creator and first director of the Real Madrid Sports City, a position he held until his retirement.

Club career
Born in Gijón, Meana began to play football in his hometown club, Sporting de Gijón, making his debut at El Molinón on 2 September 1917 against RCD Espanyol.

International career
In May 1918, he was summoned to play for the Cantabric national team, a side consisting of players from the provinces of Asturias and Cantabria, being a member of the team that participated in the 1918 Prince of Asturias Cup, an inter-regional competition organized by the RFEF.

He made his international debut on 9 October 1921 (aged 19) in a friendly match against Belgium that ended in a 2–0 win. He played in seven matches for the Spain national football team from 1921 to 1924, and scored just once, netting the first-ever goal in the Iberian derby when he scored the opening goal of a 3–1 win over Portugal on 18 December 1921, which is also the first-ever goal that Portugal ever conceded.

Being Sporting de Gijón player, he was eligible to play for the Asturias national team, and he was part of the team that reached the final of the 1922-23 Prince of Asturias Cup, an inter-regional competition organized by the RFEF. In the final against Galicia, they fell 0-1 behind early in the match, and it was Meana who equalized still in the first-half, which paved the way for José Luis Zabala to score a second-half brace to seal the title with a 3–1 win. This was his only goal for Asturias, but its also the most important in the team's history.

Managerial career
In 1928, despite still being a player, he trained Sporting de Gijón, and he managed to lead them to the semifinals of the Copa del Rey. He repeated his stay on the Gijón bench in two other stages: 1939-40 and 1948-49.

International goals

Goals for Spain
Spain score listed first, score column indicates score after each Meana goal.

Goals for AsturiasAsturias score listed first, score column indicates score after each Meana goal.

Honours

International
Cantabric
Prince of Asturias Cup:
Runner-up (1): 1918

Asturias
Prince of Asturias Cup:
Champions (1): 1922-23

References

External links
 

1901 births
1985 deaths
Spanish footballers
Spain international footballers
Association football midfielders
Footballers from Gijón
Footballers at the 1924 Summer Olympics
Olympic footballers of Spain